SS Catahoula was a Design 1022 cargo ship built for the United States Shipping Board immediately after World War I.

History
She was laid down at yard number 1538 at the Philadelphia, Pennsylvania shipyard of the American International Shipbuilding Corporation, one of 110 Design 1022 cargo ships built for the United States Shipping Board. She was completed in 1920 and named Catahoula. In 1920, she was purchased by the American Fuel & Transportation Company and converted into a tanker by the Globe Shipbuilding Company in Baltimore with a 344,963 gallon capacity. In 1921, she was returned to the USSB. In 1922, she was purchased by the Curtis Bay Copper & Iron Works (Baltimore, Maryland). In 1923, she was purchased by the Cuban Distilling Company where she was utilized to transport blackstrap molasses, a byproduct of sugar refining, to the United States where it would be used to produce cattle feed, vinegar and denatured alcohol.

On 5 April 1942, while en route from San Pedro de Macorís to Wilmington, Delaware, she was torpedoed and sunk by German submarine  U-154 northeast of the eastern tip of the Dominican Republic. 2 crewman were killed outright and 5 later drowned during the evacuation. 31 crewman and 7 armed guards were rescued the following day by the destroyer Sturtevant who had been alerted by a patrolling plane.

References

Bibliography

External links
 EFC Design 1022: Illustrations

1920 ships
Ships built in Philadelphia
Merchant ships of the United States
Maritime incidents in April 1942
Design 1022 ships
Tankers of the United States